LMDE may refer to:

 Linux Mint Debian Edition
 Lunar module descent engine